Apocalypse Live in USA  is the first live album by Brazilian progressive rock group APocalypse. The Rock Symphony Record Company release the band's double-live album recorded at North Carolina including a multimedia track with the band's history, discography, video clips, and photos. The tracks were taken from their previous CDs released by Musea Records, but there are also the Refúgio album tracks "América do Sul," "ProgJazz," and "Toccata." There is also a track called "Clássicos," which features rock versions of songs by Grieg ("In the Hall of the Mountain King"), Beethoven ("Symphony No. 9"), Bach ("Minuet From the Notebook of Ana Magdalena Bach"), Mozart ("Rondo Alla Turca, From Sonata in A"), and Tchaikovsky ("Russian Dance" from The Nutcracker Suite). Also, "Paz da Solidão" features Ravel ("Boléro").

Track listing
 "Carmina Burana" (Carl Orff) – Rock Version (5:15) 
 "Último Horizonte" (5:01) 
 "Terra Azul" (8:21) 
 "Clássicos" – Rock Version (Apocalypse) (3:58) 
 "Corta" (6:11) 
 "A Paz da Solidão" (3:35) 
 "ProgJazz" (2:54) 
 "Jamais Retornarei" (6:05) 
 "Miragem" (4:34)

Personnel 

 Eloy Fritsch – hammond organ, minimoog, electronic keyboards, vocals
 Ruy Fritsch – electric and acoustic guitars, vocals
 Chico Fasoli – drums, percussion, vocals
 Chico Casara – lead vocal, bass guitar

References

2000 live albums
Apocalypse (band) albums